Big Brother Australia 2005, also known as Big Brother 5, was the fifth season of the Australian reality television series Big Brother, and was aired on Network Ten in Australia, and TV-2 in New Zealand with a four-week delay. The series started on 8 May 2005, with housemates going into the House the day before, and finished on 15 August 2005, lasting 101 days. The theme for this season was "single, sexy and competitive". Auditions for housemates were held in March 2005. In a departure from usual procedure, candidates were not required to send in videos of themselves as had been the case for prior auditions. Instead, the producers toured major Australian cities and conducted interviews. They searched for sexy singles that were willing to have sexual relations on camera. Promos for the show suggested that Big Brother would be different this year, and phrases such as "Assume Nothing, Expect Anything", "Let's Play" and "Think Again" were used throughout the series, especially during Opening Night. The winner announced on the finale that was watched by 2.282 million Australian viewers.

Changes and additions

Fines 
On Opening Night, it was revealed that A$5,000 would be subtracted from the $1 million prize money every time the housemates broke a rule. Such rules included discussing nominations, which must remain secret, not giving adequate reasons for nominating, and forgetting to wear microphones at all times. Michelle was known for being the housemate to get the most such fines—$60,000. Geneva had the least amount of fines $15,000, two in the early days at the house and one near the end of her eviction.

The Logans 

It was revealed that twins would be entering the House, regularly changing places without the other housemates knowing—this was a twist first used on the fifth American series of Big Brother. Greg and David entered the House as a single person named Logan (their shared middle name). Their task was to remain undetected for two weeks while swapping places at Big Brother's command. The secret of the twins was discovered one week into the series by housemate Glenn, and this was revealed during Lies Exposed.

As a result, both Logans were able to continue living in the House, but would be treated as a single person in matters such as evictions and nominations. Late in the series a special eviction was held where one twin was evicted based on the votes of the other housemates, and the remaining twin allowed to continue in the House as a normal housemate. During this eviction process, David was evicted. However, because Greg was the last housemate to be evicted, both David and Greg shared the prize equally.

Housemates

Friday Night Live themes and winners

Nominations table

Notes

:  As punishment for lying during the audition process, Constance, Dean and Nelson were fake evicted and sent to the Holding Room. Believed to have been evicted, they could not be nominated by their fellow housemates. On Day 9, they were informed that all three of them would be facing the public vote in a separate eviction; Constance and Nelson were evicted the following evening.
: Dean faced the public vote alongside nominees Angela, Geneva and Tim as a result of his previous rule break (see note 1).
:  As new housemates, Rachael and Vesna were exempt from nominations and could not nominate or be nominated.
:  As new housemates, Heath, Melanie and Rita were exempt from nominations and could not nominate or be nominated.
: On Day 59, the housemates had to decide which of the three intruders they wanted to keep in the house. They collectively decided to save Rita. Heath and Melanie then faced the public vote in a special Intruder Eviction; Heath was evicted later that night.
: Housemates nominated for tenth time in fake nominations. Unbeknownst to them, their nominations didn't count, and it was revealed after nominations took place that all housemates would be facing the public vote. In the second twist of the night, Friday Night Live winners David & Greg (the Logan twins) were given two boxes, with one containing a card displaying "Not Nominated", and the other containing a card displaying "Nominated". They selected the latter box, meaning that they faced the public vote alongside their fellow housemates.
:  Four days prior to the eviction on Day 74, the housemates each had to vote to evict one of the Logan twins in a special live eviction show. The surviving twin would still represent both Logans, and would share the prize money if they won.
: All housemates faced the public vote in the final week; the housemate with the fewest votes to evict on the final night was declared the winner. A special eviction took place on Day 99 in which Vesna was evicted, after having received the most votes to evict.

Suitcase nominations 
On Day 0, each housemate was called to the diary room and asked to pick another housemate to not receive their suitcase for the duration of their time in the house. Constance had the majority and lost her suitcase. The voting went as follows:

Weekly summary and highlights

Special shows

Live Surprise 
"Live Surprise" was a live show broadcast on Day 2. During this show, the Logan twins swapped places with each other for the first time. They were given two minutes in the Diary Room to exchange as much information as possible, and Greg then had to go to the Isolation Room while David went into the Big Brother House. The Daily Show was broadcast as a part of Live Surprise. Hosted by Gretel Killeen.

Lies Exposed 
"Lies Exposed" was a show broadcast on Day 8. After Glenn's discovery that Logan was in fact two twins, this was revealed to all of the housemates. Before this, Constance, Dean and Nelson were all evicted to the Punishment Room; and were told their fate by Big Brother. Hosted by Gretel Killeen.

Viewers Verdict 
"Viewers Verdict" was a live show broadcast on Day 10. This special was aired because Constance, Dean and Nelson, had all lied about their relationship status. A public vote was held, that was started on Day 9 and was closed during the show, minutes before two of these housemates who had broken the rules were evicted. Constance and Nelson were evicted in this show, and were reunited with their partners. They both had separate eviction interviews with Gretel, and were both told that because they had deceived Big Brother, they would receive no prizes. Dean was safe, but Big Brother still punished him by banning from nominations and by putting him up for the public vote next week.

Housemates: Incoming! 
"Housemates: Incoming!" was a live show broadcast during Day 25, where replacement housemates Rachael and Vesna were introduced to the public and put in the House.

Intruders Arrive 
"Intruders Arrive" was a live show broadcast on Day 53, where Intruders Heath, Rita and Melanie entered the Big Brother House.

Intruder Eviction 
"Intruder Eviction" was a live show broadcast on Day 59. The housemates were given 1 minute 30 seconds to discuss amongst themselves which of the new Intruders, Heath, Melanie and Rita, they wanted to keep. They decided to keep Rita, so Heath and Melanie were put up for eviction. As the public SMS vote started and finished during the show, lasting only twenty minutes, viewers in Western Australia, South Australia and the Northern Territory were not able to vote as television shows in Australia are broadcast with a delay depending on the state to compensate for differences in Australian time zones. Heath received the most votes and was evicted. Hosted by Gretel Killeen.

Surprise Twin Eviction 
"Surprise Twin Eviction" was a live Eviction aired on Day 74. With David and Greg both living in the House as a single housemate, the twins were put up for eviction as two separate people. David was evicted. Hosted by Gretel Killeen.

Friday Night Live – All-Stars 
A special All Stars edition of Friday Night Live took place on Day 90. Greg, Melanie, Tim and Vesna all competed against a team of ex-housemates to try to win a A$20,000 addition to the prize fund. The team they were competing against was Paul and Wesley from Big Brother 2004, Joanne from Big Brother 2003, and Jess from Big Brother 2002; and if they won Friday Night Live, they would win the $20,000 in the form of $5,000 each. Bree Amer and Ryan Fitzgerald, Friday Night Live co-presenters and former Big Brother 2004 housemates, participated in one of the games, each as an additional member of one of the teams. The All Stars team won the Friday Night Live.

The Final Countdown 
"The Final Countdown" was aired on Day 93. In this show, Nadia Almada, winner of Big Brother 5 UK, entered the Big Brother Australia House as a house-guest. Hosted by Gretel Killeen.

The Prize Fight 
"The Prize Fight" was a special Friday Night Live that aired on Day 97. The remaining housemates were given the opportunity to win back some of the prize money they had lost in fines.

The Final Sunday Eviction 
"The Final Sunday Eviction" was the last Eviction of Big Brother 2005, and was aired on Day 99, the day before The Finale. Vesna was evicted in The Final Sunday Eviction. Hosted by Gretel Killeen.

Finale 
The season finale aired on Day 100 in which Logan Greg & Logan Mathew was announced the winners and Tim the runner-up.

References

05
2005 Australian television seasons